Kevan Leon George (born 30 January 1990) is a Trinidadian footballer who last played for Charlotte Independence in the USL Championship.

Career

Youth and college
George played on the collegiate level at University of Central Florida between 2008 and 2011. In four seasons at Central Florida, he totaled six goals and 16 assists in 73 games. He was named to the All-Conference USA First Team three times (2008, 2010, 2011).

Professional
George was drafted by the Columbus Crew in the second round (29th pick overall) of the 2012 MLS SuperDraft. He made his professional debut on 26 May 2012 in a 2–1 victory over Chicago Fire.

George possesses a United States green card which qualifies him as a domestic player for MLS roster purposes.

On 10 April 2016, George joined Jacksonville Armada FC of the North American Soccer League.

George moved to United Soccer League side Charlotte Independence on 29 January 2018.

References

External links

1990 births
Living people
Trinidad and Tobago footballers
Trinidad and Tobago expatriate footballers
Trinidad and Tobago international footballers
UCF Knights men's soccer players
Orlando City U-23 players
Columbus Crew players
Dayton Dutch Lions players
Jacksonville Armada FC players
Charlotte Independence players
Expatriate soccer players in the United States
USL League Two players
Major League Soccer players
USL Championship players
North American Soccer League players
Columbus Crew draft picks
2013 CONCACAF Gold Cup players
2014 Caribbean Cup players
2015 CONCACAF Gold Cup players
Association football midfielders
2019 CONCACAF Gold Cup players